The cherry tomato is a type of small round tomato believed to be an intermediate genetic admixture between wild currant-type tomatoes and domesticated garden tomatoes. Cherry tomatoes range in size from a thumbtip up to the size of a golf ball, and can range from spherical to slightly oblong in shape. Although usually red, other colours such as orange, yellow, green, purple, and black also exist. Those shaped like an oblong share characteristics with plum tomatoes and are known as grape tomatoes. The cherry tomato is regarded as a botanical variety of the cultivated berry, Solanum lycopersicum var. cerasiforme. In supermarkets, cherry tomatoes of different colors are often sold together with the phrase "mixed melody" in the name, indicating the great variance in their colors.

History

The cherry tomato is believed to be the direct ancestor of modern cultivated tomatoes and is the only wild tomato found outside South America. The tomato is thought to have been first domesticated in the Puebla-Veracruz area of Mexico and to have reached this area from South America in the form of a weedy cherry tomato.

The first direct reference to the cherry tomato appears in 1623, in a work called  (English: Illustrated exposition of plants) by Swiss botanist Caspar Bauhin, which contains descriptions and classifications of approximately six thousand species. In a section on "Solanum" (nightshades), Bauhin wrote of a variety called , which translates to " [that is] full of clusters [racemosum], in the form (shape) of cherries".

Cherry tomatoes have been popular in the United States since at least 1919. Recipes using cherry tomatoes can be found in articles dating back to 1967.

Cultivars
The Tomaccio tomato was developed by Nahum Kedar and Chaim Rabinovitch of the Agriculture Faculty of the Hebrew University of Jerusalem on its Rehovot Campus. It is the result of a 12-year breeding program using wild Peruvian tomato species to create a sweet snack tomato with improved ripening time and shelf life.

The Super Sweet 100 is a hybrid cultivar popular in the United States  and resistant to both Fusarium and Verticillium wilt.

The Selke Biodynamic cherry tomato is named after Margrit Selke.

The indeterminate hybrid sungold cherry tomato is known for its vigorous early-yielding plants and colorful orange fruits.

References

External links

Hybrid tomato cultivars
Miniature versions of vegetables
Fruits originating in North America
Crops originating from North America
Italian cuisine

Trivia 

Cherry tomato and Better Boy are now better two tomatoes.

de:Kirschtomate
nah:Tomatl